The Interim Administrative Council (IAC),, was an interim cabinet for Kosovo established on 15 December 1999 by the United Nations Interim Administration Mission in Kosovo (UNMIK) as part of the Joint Interim Administrative Structure. Its purpose was to advise the Special Representative of the Secretary General on policies relating to the other JIAS bodies. It was composed of 10 members, 4 nominated by the United Nations, 3 representatives of Kosovo Albanians, 1 representative of Kosovo Serbs and 2 additional observer members. The IAC was replace on 3 March 2002 by a cabinet established as part of the Provisional Institutions of Self-Government following elections held in November 2021.

Members

The membership of the council was as follows:

References

Politics of Kosovo